Robinus Syngkon is an Indian politician. He was elected to the Meghalaya Legislative Assembly from Mowkaiaw in the 2013 Meghalaya Legislative Assembly election as a member of the Independents. He joined Bharatiya Janata Party in 2018.

References

1954 births
Living people
Bharatiya Janata Party politicians from Meghalaya
People from West Jaintia Hills district
Meghalaya MLAs 2013–2018
Trinamool Congress politicians from Meghalaya